YCCS may refer to:
 Youth Connection Charter School (Chicago)
 Yuba City Charter School
 Yacht Club Costa Smeralda (Porto Cervo)